Destination London may refer to:

 Agent Cody Banks 2: Destination London, a 2003 film starring Frankie Muniz
 Destination (game), one of a set of board games by RTL games